The Plater family is a noble family originating from Westphalia, whose members settled in Livonia and later in Lithuania and Poland. The part of the family that moved in 15th century to Livonia used the name Plater or the combined surname Broel-Plater. In order to save his wife's family name, he adopted her surname and coat of arms.

The Platers returned to Catholicism in the 17th century and held high offices in the Polish-Lithuanian Commonwealth and achieved magnate status in the 18th century, with six representatives of the family achieveing a seat in the Senate. The basis of the family's importance in Polish Livonia was the uninterrupted holding of the post of starosta in Dyneburg since 1670.

Notable members of the family 

 Gotard Jan Plater (d. 1664) – militaryman
 Jan Andrzej Plater (1626-1696) – voivode of Livonia
 Ferdinand Fabian Plater (1678-1739) – Court Marshal of Lithuania
 Jan Ludwik Plater (d. 1736) – voivode of Livonia
 Konstanty Ludwik Plater (1722-1778) –  voivode of Mstislavl
 August Hiacynt Plater (1745-1803) – marshal of the Targowica Confederation
 Józef Wincenty Plater (1745-1806) – field notary of Lithuania
 Kazimierz Konstanty Plater (1749-1807) – starosta
 Jerzy Konstanty Plater (1810-1836) – bibliographer
 Ludwik August Plater (1775-1846) – insurgent of the Kościuszko Insurrection
 Konstanty Plater (1778-1849) – marshal of nobility
 Stanisław Plater (1784-1851) – officer, historian, geographer
 Adam Antoni Plater (1790-1862) – landowner, polymath, zoologist
 Emilia Plater (1806-1831) – officer of the November Uprising
 Lucjan Stanisław Plater (1808-1857) – November Uprising insurgent
 Michał Plater-Zyberk (1777-1862) – naturalist
 Henryk Ludwik Plater (1817-1868) – clergyman
 Leon Plater (1836-1863) – insurgent of the January Uprising, executed in Dyneburg
 Władysław Plater (1808-1889) – founder of the Polish National Museum in Rapperswil
 Ludwik Kazimierz Plater (1844-1909) – landowner, industrialist, economic activist
 Adam Alfred Plater (1836-1909) – archaeologist, marshal of the nobility
 Cecylia Plater-Zyberk (1853-1920) – social activist, educator and publicist.
 Zygmunt Plater-Zyberk (1901-1978) – architect
 Kazimierz Plater (1915-2004) – chess player
 Elizabeth Plater-Zyberk (b. 1950) – architect and urban planner

Bibliography